Romanization or Latinization of Belarusian is any system for transliterating written Belarusian from Cyrillic to the Latin alphabet.

Standard systems for romanizing Belarusian

Standard systems for romanizing Belarusian include:
BGN/PCGN romanization of Belarusian, 1979 (United States Board on Geographic Names and Permanent Committee on Geographical Names for British Official Use), which is the US and Great Britain prevailing system for romanising of geographical information
British Standard 2979 : 1958
Scientific transliteration, or the International Scholarly System for linguistics
ALA-LC romanization, 1997 (American Library Association and Library of Congress)
ISO 9:1995, which is also Belarusian state standard GOST 7.79–2000 for non-geographical information
Instruction on transliteration of Belarusian geographical names with letters of Latin script, which is Belarusian state standard for geographical information, adopted by State Committee on land resources, geodetics and cartography of Belarus, 2000 and recommended for use by the Working Group on Romanization Systems of the United Nations Group of Experts on Geographical Names (UNGEGN). It was significantly revised in 2007.

Examples

See also
Belarusian Latin alphabet (Łacinka / лацінка)
Cyrillic alphabets
Cyrillic script
Romanization of Bulgarian
Romanization of Macedonian
Romanization of Russian
Romanization of Serbian
Romanization of Ukrainian
Scientific transliteration of Cyrillic

See also
Belarusian alphabet
Cyrillic alphabets
Cyrillic script
Faux Cyrillic
Greek alphabet
Macedonian alphabet
Montenegrin alphabet
Romanization of Bulgarian
Romanization of Greek
Romanization of Macedonian
Romanization of Russian
Scientific romanization of Cyrillic
Ukrainian alphabet
Ukrainian Latin alphabet
Russian alphabet
Scientific transliteration of Cyrillic
Serbian Cyrillic alphabet

References
British Standard 2979 : 1958, London: British Standards Institution.
United Nations Statistics Division, Geographical Names

Belarusian language
Belarusian